Samuel Hideo Yamashita (born 1946) is an American historian and Asian studies scholar. His research interests include Confucianism, daily life in wartime Japan, and Japanese cuisine. He is the Henry E. Sheffield Professor of History at Pomona College.

Early life and education
Yamashita was born in 1946. He attended Macalester College and subsequently received his doctorate from the University of Michigan.

Career
Yamashita began teaching at Pomona College in 1983.

Works

References

External links
Pomona College faculty page
Biographical interview on the Pomona College Sagecast

American historians
Macalester College alumni
University of Michigan alumni
Pomona College faculty
Living people
East Asian studies scholars
1946 births
American Japanologists